Sir Emmanuel Kaye (29 November 1914 – 28 February 1999) was a millionaire British industrialist and philanthropist known for founding Lansing Bagnall.

Kaye was born in Russia, the son of wheat merchant Zelman Kagarlisky (1877/1878–1926; his name was also spelled "Zalman Kagarlitzky") and his wife, Chassia Annie (1885/6–1943), a botanist. The family came to England when he was young, settling in London. Emmanuel was educated at Richmond Hill School, leaving to work for a small engineering firm at the age of 15. In 1934, his mother changed the family name to "Kaye".

He was a donor to Tony Blair's Labour Leader's Office Fund before the 1997 General Election. Kaye was associated with the Labour Friends of Israel.

Among major beneficiaries of his philanthropy was Emmanuel College, Cambridge, which made him an Honorary Member in 1994. He was Vice-Chairman (1981-85) and Chairman (1985–99) of the Thrombosis Research Trust.

Personal life
In 1946, Kaye married Elizabeth, daughter of Mark Cutler; they had a son and two daughters. He was appointed C.B.E. in 1967, and Knight Bachelor in 1974.

References

Further reading 
Labour Party PLC: New Labour as a Party of Business—lengthy extract from David Osler's book about Labour fundraising and the Labour Leader's Office Fund 

1914 births
1999 deaths
20th-century British businesspeople
British Jews
British people of Russian-Jewish descent
Knights Bachelor
Burials at Willesden Jewish Cemetery
Labour Friends of Israel
20th-century British philanthropists